Jorge Meré Pérez (born 17 April 1997) is a Spanish professional footballer who plays as a centre-back for Cádiz CF on loan from Liga MX club Club América.

Club career

Sporting Gijón
Born in Oviedo, Asturias, Meré joined Sporting de Gijón's youth setup in 2010 after starting out at neighbours Real Oviedo, and he made his senior debut with the reserves in the 2013–14 season (aged only 16), in Segunda División B. On 24 July 2014, he signed a new five-year deal with the club, with a €25 million release clause.

In January 2015, Meré was linked to Newcastle United, but nothing came of it. On 11 April, he played his first game as a professional, starting in a 1–1 away draw against Real Zaragoza in the Segunda División.

Meré appeared in five matches for the first team during the campaign, as they returned to La Liga after a three-year absence. He made his debut in the competition on 23 September 2015, starting in a 2–1 away loss to Rayo Vallecano.

Meré contributed 25 appearances during 2015–16, overcoming Bernardo Espinosa (who was sidelined due to an injury), Igor Lichnovsky and Ognjen Vranješ as his side avoided relegation in the last matchday. He was named Sporting's player of the season, with his father accepting the award on his behalf.

1. FC Köln
On 20 July 2017, Meré joined 1. FC Köln on a five-year contract for a fee believed to be between €8.5 million and €9 million, becoming the highest transfer ever received by Sporting. His first game in the Bundesliga took place on 9 September, when he played the second half of a 3–0 away loss against FC Augsburg.

Meré scored his first goal as a professional on 2 February 2018, but in a 2–3 home defeat to Borussia Dortmund.

América
On 18 January 2022, Meré agreed to a deal at Club América of the Mexican Liga MX. In August, he was loaned to Mazatlán F.C. in the same country and league.

Meré returned to Spain and its top flight in January 2023, on loan to Cádiz CF until 30 June.

International career
Meré represented Spain at every age group level, from the under-15 to the under-21s. In 2012 he appeared for the former at the Mexico Cup of Nations, and was part of the under-19 squad who won the UEFA European Championship in 2015; earlier in that year, aged only 18, he earned his first cap for the under-21 team, in a 4–0 win over Belarus.

In May 2016, 19-year-old Meré was called up to the full squad for the first time, for a friendly against Bosnia and Herzegovina.

Career statistics

Honours
FC Köln
2. Bundesliga: 2018–19

Spain U19
UEFA European Under-19 Championship: 2015

Spain U21
UEFA European Under-21 Championship: 2019; runner-up 2017

References

External links

1997 births
Living people
Spanish footballers
Footballers from Oviedo
Association football defenders
La Liga players
Segunda División players
Segunda División B players
Sporting de Gijón B players
Sporting de Gijón players
Cádiz CF players
Bundesliga players
2. Bundesliga players
1. FC Köln players
Liga MX players
Club América footballers
Mazatlán F.C. footballers
Spain youth international footballers
Spain under-21 international footballers
Spanish expatriate footballers
Expatriate footballers in Germany
Expatriate footballers in Mexico
Spanish expatriate sportspeople in Germany
Spanish expatriate sportspeople in Mexico